, there were around 800 electric vehicles (not including plug-in hybrid vehicles) registered in Manitoba. , about 0.8% of all new vehicles registered in Manitoba were electric.

Government policy
, the provincial government does not offer any tax incentives for electric vehicle purchases.

Manufacturing
Manitoba has been proposed as a hub for the mining of lithium to be used in electric vehicle batteries.

By region

Brandon
, there were eight public charging stations in Brandon.

Winnipeg
, there were 15 public charging stations in Winnipeg, three of which were DC charging stations.

References

Manitoba
Transport in Manitoba